Candle in the Window is the fourth studio album by Canadian country music artist Joan Kennedy. It was released by MCA Records in 1990. The album peaked at number 26 on the RPM Country Albums chart.

Track listing
"The Trouble with Love"
"Sometimes She Feels Like a Man"
"Spanish Is a Loving Tongue"
"If You Want Love"
"Some People Belong Together"
"Wild Again"
"God's Green Earth"
"Just Can't Let Go"
"I Never Met a Liar (I Didn't Like)"
"Candle in the Window"

Chart performance

References

External links
[ Candle in the Window] at Allmusic

1990 albums
Joan Kennedy (musician) albums
MCA Records albums